Clube Atlético Guaçuano, commonly known as Guaçuano, is a currently inactive Brazilian football club based in Mogi Guaçu, São Paulo state.

History
The club was founded on February 26, 1929. They competed for the first time in a professional competition in 1975, when they participated in the Campeonato Paulista Série A3, replacing Grêmio Guaçuano.

Stadium
Clube Atlético Guaçuano play their home games at Estádio Municipal Alexandre Augusto Camacho. The stadium has a maximum capacity of 5,594 people.

References

Inactive football clubs in Brazil
Association football clubs established in 1929
Football clubs in São Paulo (state)
1929 establishments in Brazil